This is a list of Estonian football transfers in the summer transfer window 2020 by club.

This transfer window is open during the 2020 Meistriliiga season.

Meistriliiga

Flora Tallinn

In:

 →

Out:

FCI Levadia

In:

Out:

Nõmme Kalju

In:

Out:

Paide Linnameeskond

In:

Out:

Tartu Tammeka

In:

Out:

Narva Trans

In:

Out:

Viljandi Tulevik

In:

Out:

Tallinna Kalev

In:

Out:

Kuressaare

In:

Out:

Tallinna Legion

In:

Out:

References

External links
 Official site of the Estonian Football Association
 Official site of the Meistriliiga

Estonian
Transfers
2020